Robert Schenck may refer to:

 Robert C. Schenck (1809–1890), American Civil War general and politician
 Robert C. Schenck (politician) (born 1975), Republican member of the Florida House of Representatives
 Rob Schenck (Robert Leonard Schenck, born 1958), American pastor and former anti-abortion activist